Ballyvoige (Irish: Baile Uí Bhuaigh) is a townland in the civil parish of Desertserges, County Cork, Ireland.

Archaeology
Archaeological sites include a ringfort and souterrain.

See also 
 List of townlands of the Barony of East Carbery (E.D.)

References 

Townlands of County Cork